Jermaine is a masculine given name of Latin origin, derived from the French given name , which is in turn derived from the Latin given name , meaning "brother".

The masculine given name Jermaine was popularized in the 1970s by Jermaine Jackson (born 1954), a member of the singing group The Jackson 5.

Jermaine ranked among the top 200 names given to boys born in the United States between 1960 and 1980. It has since declined in popularity and was ranked as the 738th most popular name for American males born in 2013. It is considered to be an African-American name. Jermaine is a variant of Germaine.

People

Those bearing the masculine given name Jermaine include:

 Jermaine Ale (born 1985), Australian rugby league player
 Jermaine Allen (born 1983), American football running back 
 Jermaine Allensworth (born 1972), American baseball player
 Jermaine Anderson (born 1983), Canadian basketball player
 Jermaine Anderson (English footballer) (born 1996), English footballer
 Jermaine Anderson (Jamaican footballer) (born 1979), Jamaican footballer
 Jermaine Beal (born 1987), American basketball player
 Jermaine Beckford (born 1983), Jamaican footballer
 Jermaine Bishop (born 1997), American basketball player
 Jermaine Blackburn (born 1983), American basketball player
 Jermaine Blackwood (born 1991), Jamaican cricketer
 Jermaine Brown (athlete) (born 1991), Jamaican sprinter
 Jermaine Brown (footballer born 1983) (born 1983), English footballer 
 Jermaine Brown (footballer born 1985) (born 1985), Caymanian football goalkeeper
 Jermaine Bucknor (born 1983), Canadian basketball player
 Jermaine Carter (born 1995), American football player
 Jermaine Clark (born 1976), American baseball player
 Jemaine Clement (born 1974), New Zealander folk musician and comedian, part of the duo Flight of the Conchords.
 Jermaine Cole (known as J. Cole for short); (born 1985), American rapper, music producer, songwriter, official recording artist for Roc Nation.
 Jermaine Crawford (born 1992), American actor
 Jermaine Cunningham (born 1988), American football outside linebacker
 Jermaine Curtis (born 1987), American baseball player
 Jermaine Darlington (born 1974), English footballer
 Jermain Defoe (born 1982), English footballer
 Jermaine Dupri (born 1972), American music producer, rapper and Grammy winning songwriter
 Jermaine Dye (born 1974), American baseball player
 Jermaine Easter (born 1982), Welsh footballer
 Jermaine Eluemunor (born 1994), British-American football player
 Jermaine Fagan (born 1978), Jamaican musician
 Jermaine Fazande (born 1975), American football running back
 Jermaine Gabriel (born 1990), Canadian football defensive back
 Jermaine Gonsalves (born 1976), British basketball player
 Jermaine Gonzales (born 1984), Jamaican runner
 Jermaine Grandison (born 1990), English footballer
 Jermaine Gresham (born 1988), American football tight end 
 Jermaine Gumbs (born 1986), Anguillan footballer
 Jermaine Haley (born 1973), American football defensive tackle 
Jermaine Hall (born 1980), American basketball player for Maccabi Ashdod of the Israeli Basketball Premier League
 Jermaine Hardy (born 1982), American football defensive back
 Jermaine Hollis (born 1986), English footballer
 Jermaine Holwyn (born 1973), Dutch footballer
 Jermaine Hopkins (born 1973), American actor
 Jermaine Hue (born 1978), Jamaican footballer
 Jermaine Jackman (born 1995), English singer
 Jermaine Jackson (born 1954), American musician
 Jermaine Jackson (basketball) (born 1976), American basketball player
 Jermaine Jackson (gridiron football) (born 1982), Canadian football wide receiver
 Jermaine Jenas (born 1983), English footballer
 Jermaine Johnson (born 1980), Jamaican footballer
 Jermaine Jones (born 1981), American footballer
 Jermaine Jones (American football) (born 1976), American Arena Football League player
 Jermaine Jones (singer) (born 1986), American singer, and actor
 Jermaine Joseph (born 1980), Canadian sprinter
 Jermaine Kearse (born 1990), American football wide receiver
 Jermaine Kelly (born 1995), American football player
 Jermaine Lawson (born 1982), Jamaican cricketer
 Jermaine Lewis (disambiguation), multiple people
 Jermaine Mays (born 1979), American football cornerback, and Canadian football cornerback
 Jermaine McElveen (born 1984), Canadian football defensive end
 Jermaine McGhee (born 1983), American football defensive end
 Jermaine McGillvary (born 1988), English rugby league footballer
 Jermaine McGlashan (born 1988), English footballer
 Jermaine McSporran (born 1977), English footballer
 Jermaine O'Neal (born 1978), American basketball player
 Jermaine Palmer (born 1986), English footballer
 Jermaine Paul (born 1978), American singer
 Jermaine Pennant (born 1983), English footballer
 Jermaine Phillips (born 1979), American football safety
 Jermaine Post (born 1992), Dutch cycle racer
 Jermaine Reid (born 1983), Canadian football defensive tackle
 Jermaine Rogers (born 1972), American artist, and designer
 Jermaine Ross (born 1971), American football player
 W. Jermaine Sailor (born 1974), Australian dual-code rugby international
 Jermaine Sandvliet (born 1977), Dutch footballer
 Jermaine Sinclair (known as Wretch 32 for stage name); (born 1985), English rapper
 Jermaine Smith (born 1972), American Arena Football League player
 Jermaine Stewart (1957–1997), American singer
 Jermain Taylor (born 1978), American boxer
 Jermaine Taylor (basketball) (born 1986), American basketball player
 Jermaine Taylor (footballer) (born 1985), Jamaican footballer
 Jermaine Thomas (born 1990), Canadian football running back
 Jermaine Thomas (basketball) (born 1984), American basketball player
 Jermaine Turner (born 1974), American basketball player
 Jermaine Van Buren (born 1980), American baseball player
 Jermaine van Pijkeren (born 1991), Dutch footballer
 Jermaine Walker (born 1977), American basketball player
 Jermaine Warner (born 1971), Bermudian cricketer
 Jermaine White (born 1982), American boxer
 Jermaine Whitehead (born 1993), American football player
 Jermaine Wiggins (born 1975), American football player
 Jermaine Williams (born 1982), American actor, and dancer
 Jermaine Williams (American football) (born 1973), American football running back
 Jermaine Woozencroft (born 1992), Jamaican footballer
 Jermaine Wright (born 1975), English footballer

References

Masculine given names
English masculine given names